Pratyusha Rajeshwari Singh, popularly known as "Rani Maa Nayagarh" is an Indian politician. She is the BJP Odisha State Vice President. She was a Member of Parliament elected for the 16th Lok Sabha by-election as a member of the BJD . She is from Nayagarh in Odisha state, India, and is the wife of the former MP Hemendra Chandra Singh. She resigned from BJD and joined BJP on March 23, 2019.

References

Living people
Lok Sabha members from Odisha
India MPs 2014–2019
Women in Odisha politics
1971 births
People from Kandhamal district
21st-century Indian women politicians
21st-century Indian politicians
Bharatiya Janata Party politicians from Odisha
Biju Janata Dal politicians